Østerhus is a village in Grimstad municipality in Agder county, Norway. There is a large industrial area in Østerhus.

References

Villages in Agder
Grimstad